The 25th Annual D.I.C.E. Awards is the 25th edition of the D.I.C.E. Awards ("Design Innovate Communicate Entertain"), an annual awards event that honors the best games in the video game industry during 2021. The awards were arranged by the Academy of Interactive Arts & Sciences (AIAS). The nominees were announced on January 13, 2022.

Ratchet & Clank: Rift Apart received the most nominations, and won the most awards, while It Takes Two won Game of the Year.

Ed Boon, co-creator of the Mortal Kombat franchise, received the Hall of Fame award. Phil Spencer, CEO of Microsoft Gaming and head of Xbox Game Studios, received the Lifetime Achievement Award.

Winners and Nominees
Winners are listed first, highlighted in boldface, and indicated with a double dagger.

Special Awards

Hall of Fame
 Ed Boon

Lifetime Achievement
 Phil Spencer

Games with multiple nominations and awards

The following 19 games received multiple nominations:

The following six games received multiple awards:

Companies with multiple nominations

Companies that received multiple nominations as either a developer or a publisher.

Companies that received multiple awards as either a developer or a publisher.

External links
 
 Finalists Revealed

References

2021 awards
2021 awards in the United States
April 2021 events in the United States
2021 in video gaming
D.I.C.E. Award ceremonies